Cheongju National Museum is a national museum located in Sangdang-guCheongju, Chungcheongbuk-do, South Korea. It opened on October 30, 1987. Kim Swoo Geun, Korea's most renowned architect designed the building.

See also
List of museums in South Korea

References

External links
 Cheong National Museum Official site

National museums of South Korea
Museums in North Chungcheong Province
Museums established in 1987
Cheongju